Nanshan District (Cantonese Jyutping: Naam4 Saan1 Keoi1) is one of the nine districts comprising Shenzhen. It encompasses the southwest area of the Shenzhen Special Economic Zone, with a population of 1.08 million. In 2013, the district of Nanshan's local GDP output exceeded 320 billion RMB. The region has an established tourism industry and is home to several sightseeing locations.

It is known for being the home of Shenzhen High-Tech Industrial Park, which comprises some of China's largest technology companies and the establishments of well-known international companies, as well as being one of the nation's richest districts.

Geography
The area continued to increase due to large scale land reclamation, especially in Qianhai and Houhai. The district is located to the northwest of Deep Bay, east of the Pearl River entrance. Its northern boundary is Yangtaishan, which divides the district with Baoan, while it is bounded south by Inner Lingding Island and Dachan Island, though the Port of Shekou is the southernmost point on the peninsula. Nanshan is situated about a degree south of the Tropic of Cancer and has a humid subtropical climate. It sits directly north of Yuen Long district of Hong Kong. More than half of the district consist of urban areas. Mountainous areas like Tanglangshan and Yangtaishan to the north and Nanshan Park to the south are largely preserved as forests.

History

Nanshan was largely a rural area before being rapidly developed since the late 1970s, with the exception of a few towns and villages. Nantou, the seat of Bao'an County for almost 1700 years was located within the district.

In September 1983, Nantou district was established as a county-level district. Less than a year later in August 1984, Shekou, which came to be known as Shekou subdistrict today, split off as a separate district from Nanshan. In September 1990,the two districts combined to form the present Nanshan District.

Nanshan experienced large sums of migrants from other parts of the country. Most of the original towns in the district had either been demolished to make way for developments or became what are to be known as urban villages.

Demographics
As of the end of 2011, Nanshan district had a total resident population of 1,087,936 and a census-registered population of 0.5492 million. The vast majority of the population are concentrated in the southern half of the district.

Administrative divisions
Nanshan District is organized into the following subdistricts.

Transportation

Shenzhen Metro
Nanshan is currently served by six metro lines operated by Shenzhen Metro:

   - OCT, Window of the World , Baishizhou, Hi-Tech Park, Shenzhen University, Taoyuan, Daxin, Liyumen, Qianhaiwan  
   - Chiwan , Shekou Port, Sea World, Shuiwan, Dongjiaotou, Wanxia, Haiyue, Dengliang, Houhai , Keyuan, Hongshuwan, Window of the World , Qiaocheng North
   - Chiwan , Liwan, Railway Park, Mawan, Qianwan Park, Qianwan , Guiwan, Qianhaiwan  , Liuxiandong, Xili , University Town, Tanglang, Changlingpi
   - Xili Lake, Xili , Chaguang, Zhuguang, Longjing, Taoyuancun, Shenyun
   - Qianwan , Menghai, Litchi Orchards, Nanyou West, Nanyou, Nanshan Book Mall, Shenzhen University South, Yuehaimen, High-Tech South, Hongshuwan South , Shenwan, Shenzhen Bay Park
   - Qianhaiwan  , Nanshan, Houhai , Hongshuwan South

Railway Stations
 Shekou West
 Mawan
 Shenzhen West
 Xili

Container Ports

 Shekou
 Dongjiaotou
 Chiwan
 Mawan
 Qianhai

Maritime Transport
The Shekou Passenger Terminal offered ferry service to Hong Kong (Hong Kong Island and Hong Kong International Airport), Zhuhai and Macau. Now the Shekou Cruise Center has that role.

Cross boundary coaches to and from Hong Kong are also available at Shenzhen Bay Port. The port it located geographically at Shekou hence all coach will travel along the Hong Kong-Shenzhen Western Corridor to get to Hong Kong.

Economy
Coolpad, Tencent, ZTE, and China Resources Beverage (CR Beverage), among others, have their headquarters at Hi-Tech Park, Nanshan.

The South China office of CR Beverage is in on the 10th floor of the Min Tai Building in the district.
China Nepstar has its headquarters in the Xinnengyuan Building (/) on Nanhai Road, Nanshan District. The headquarters of Evergrande Group are in Nanshan.

The drink company Hey Tea has its headquarters in the Aerospace Science And Technology Square.

The department store chain Ren Ren Le has its headquarters in Nanshan District.

Free Trade Zones

Qianhai Shenzhen-Hong Kong Modern Service Industry Cooperation Zone is a large masterplanned commercial free trade zone comprising  of reclaimed land under construction in Qianhai, Nanshan. Upon scheduled completion in 2020, special policies including lower taxation rates would be implemented in the new district.

Shekou is another free trade zone, redeveloping from a former industrial zone.

Education

Universities
Eight of Shenzhen's eleven full-time universities are located in Nanshan:

Shenzhen University
Shenzhen Polytechnic
Shenzhen University City
Graduate School at Shenzhen, Tsinghua University
Graduate School at Shenzhen, Peking University
Graduate School at Shenzhen, Harbin Institute of Technology
Southern University of Science and Technology
Financial College of Nankai University
Shenzhen Virtual University Park

Primary and secondary schools

Government secondary schools
The Chinese word Zhongxue 中学, rendered in English as "middle school," may refer to either schools with grade 7-9 lower secondary levels and/or grade 10-12 upper secondary levels.  Dr. Elisabeth P. Montgomery, Senior Advisor on Internationalization for the Nanshan District Education Bureau, is the first foreigner to hold such a position in China.  She helped design education curricula for Nanshan grades 1-12 and is one of three designers of Shenzhen YuCai High School, International Department.  Additionally, she is Foreign Vice Principal at the South China University of Science and Technology (SUSTECH) Education Group, International Advisor in China and Latin America, and public school Inspector.  

Some are governed by the Shenzhen municipal government. Those include:
Shenzhen Experimental School

Some are governed by the Nanshan District government. Those include:
 Nanshan Middle School Attached to Beijing Normal University (北京师范大学南山附属学校中学部)
 Shenzhen Bolun Vocational and Technical School (深圳市博伦职业技术学校)
 Shenzhen Nanshan Experimental Education Group (深圳市南山实验教育集团)
 Nanhai Middle School (南海中学)
 Qilin Middle School (麒麟中学)
 Shenzhen Nanshan Foreign Language School (Group) (深圳市南山外国语学校（集团）/深圳南山外國語學校)
 Binhai Middle School (滨海中学)
 Gaoxin Middle School (高新中学)
 Taoyuan Middle School (桃源中学)
 High School (高级中学)
 Second Foreign Language School of Nanshan (Group) (深圳市南山区第二外国语学校（集团）)
 Xuefu Middle School (学府中学)
 Shenzhen Shekou Yucai Education Group (深圳市蛇口育才教育集团)
 Yucai High School 
 
 Yucai No.3 Middle School 
 Shenzhen Nanshan OCT High School 深圳市南山区华侨城中学/華僑城中學
 OCT Campus (侨城初中部)
 Shenwan Campus (深圳湾部)
 Shenzhen Nantou High School (深圳市南头中学/南頭中學)

Other:
Lixiang Middle School 荔香中學/荔香中学
Shekou School, merged from Shekou Middle School
Shenzhen Nanshan Bilingual School, a Cambridge International Center (CIC) Middle School

International and private schools

There are four Anglophone international high schools and private high schools in Nanshan. Several of these high schools all offer British, University of Cambridge International A-Level or North American style curricula, with English as the main language of instruction. There are also Japanese and South Korean-style schools.

 The International School of Nanshan Shenzhen
 Shenzhen Nanshan Chinese International College (formerly Nanshan Bilingual School/Baishizhou Bilingual School)
 Shekou International School
 QSI International School of Shekou.
Shenzhen American International School
BASIS international school of shenzhen
Shen Wai International school

International K-12 schools include:
 KIS Korean International School of Shenzhen (Korean section and English elementary section)
International 1-9 schools include:
 Shenzhen Japanese School

Supplementary schools
, a Japanese weekend school, has its office on the 8th floor of the Jinsanjiao Building in Baishizhou. Previously it was based in the Ming Wah International Convention Center in Shekou.

In addition, the Shenzhen Korean Chamber of Commerce and Industry organizes a Korean Saturday school because many Korean students are not studying in Korean-medium schools; the school had about 600 students in 2007. The chamber uses rented space in the OCT Primary School as the Korean weekend school's classroom.

Gallery

References

External links

 

 
Districts of Shenzhen
High-technology business districts in China
Information technology places